Ditrigona triangularia is a moth in the family Drepanidae first described by Frederic Moore in 1868. It is found in the north-eastern Himalayas, China, Taiwan and Thailand.

The wingspan is 27–34 mm. Adults are on wing in March.

References

Moths described in 1868
Drepaninae
Moths of Asia